Montgomery County Public Schools may refer to:
Montgomery County Public Schools (Maryland)
Montgomery County Public Schools (Virginia)